The Los Angeles Aztecs were an American professional soccer team based in Los Angeles, California that existed from 1974 to 1981. The Aztecs competed in the North American Soccer League (NASL) from 1974 to 1981 as well as the 1975 NASL Indoor tournament, the 1979–80 and 1980–81 NASL Indoor seasons, and won the NASL Championship in 1974. During their eight years of existence, the Aztecs played at four different venues and were controlled by four different ownership groups, European football legends George Best and Johan Cruyff played for the team, and from 1975 to 1977 English singer Elton John was a part-owner.

History

Founding and First Season Success
In January 1974, looking to build off what was considered increasing public interest in professional soccer, the NASL announced Los Angeles as one of six cities awarded an expansion team for the upcoming 1974 season. Jack Gregory, a local doctor and real estate investor, paid the franchise fee and acted as team owner  and Alex Perolli was appointed the first head coach.  
After playing a series of pre-season friendlies against teams from Mexico, the Aztecs opened their first NASL season with a 2–1 win over the Seattle Sounders at the East Los Angeles College Stadium with 4,107 fans in attendance.  After three consecutive victories to start the season, Perolli publicly criticized and then fired his starting goal keeper, Trinidad and Tobago international Kelvin Barclay, after he allowed three goals in the second half.  The Aztecs finished the season with a record of 11 wins, 2 draws and 7 losses, averaging 5,098 fans per game, and winning first place in the Western Division .  Forward Doug McMillan scored eleven goals and was named Rookie of the Year for the 1974 season, an honor he had separately won the previous season with the Cleveland Stars of the American Soccer League. Having earned a first round bye, the Aztecs defeated the Boston Minutemen 2–0 at home in the semi-finals.  Having earned the most points during the season, Los Angeles should have hosted the NASL Final 1974; however, due to the CBS televised start time of 3:30 (EDT) and other factors, the game was moved to the Miami Orange Bowl.  On August 25, 1974, with 15,507 people in attendance, the Los Angeles Aztecs and the Miami Toros played to a 3–3 draw in regular time, after which Los Angeles won the penalty shoot-out 5–3 to win the 1974 NASL Championship.  It was the second year in a row that an expansion franchise and won the championship following the Philadelphia Atoms in 1973.

New Ownership

Following the 1974 season, Alex Perolli left his position as head coach to take up the same job at the expansion San Antonio Thunder and owner Jack Gregory sold his interest in the team to a group headed by John Chaffetz The new owners hired 25 year old Terry Fisher, at the time the youngest coach in the NASL, giving him a two year contract as head coach.  That February, the team traded its first and second draft choices to the expansion Chicago Sting and drafted Michael Bain, two-time All-American and captain of the 1974 NCAA Division I Soccer champions Howard Bison.  The Aztecs were one of the sixteen NASL teams to participate in the 1975 NASL Indoor tournament.  In total, the Aztecs played three indoor matches in 1975, a pre-tournament tune-up match against the San Jose Earthquakes on February 14, and tournament matches against the Vancouver Whitecaps and Seattle Sounders.

The Aztecs opened the 1975 North American Soccer League season with a 2–1 victory on the road against the San Jose Earthquakes.  The team's first home sellout occurred on July 3, 1975, in a 5–1 rout of the Pelé led New York Cosmos, Uri Banhoffer scored a hat-trick and was named NASL player of the week for his performance.  The team officially protested their 2 August 1975 2–1 overtime loss to Earthquakes stating crowd noise prevented head coach Fisher from communicating with his players between the end of regulation and the beginning of overtime.  The team finished the season with a record of twelve wins and ten losses, ending in third place of the Western Division.  Making the playoffs as a wild card after Chicago Sting lost their final game of the season to the Washington Diplomats, the Aztecs were defeated by the St. Louis Stars in a quarter-finals match that was decided by a penalty shoot-out.

Best Years

Following the 1975 season, English singer Elton John, purchased a stake in the team, and was given permission by the league to sit on the bench during games.  A few weeks later, Managing General Partner Chaffetz announced the team's intention of signing 1968 Ballon d'Or winner George Best, who had been released by Manchester United.  After some confusion in December between the team announcing Best's signing and the player denying he had, George Best arrived in Los Angeles on February 20, 1976.  The Aztecs opened the 1976 North American Soccer League season on the road with a 1–2 loss against the San Jose Earthquakes, Best scored his first of fifteen goals for the season on April 25, 1976, in the team's home opener against the Rochester Lancers.  Los Angeles finished the season in third place of the Pacific Conference Southern Division with a record of twelve wins and twelve losses.  The Aztecs were defeated in the First Round of the playoffs 2–0 by the Dallas Tornado on August 18, 1976.

After playing the previous two seasons at Murdock Stadium on the campus of El Camino College, the team moved to the L.A. Coliseum for the 1977 season.  The Aztecs began the 1977 North American Soccer League season on the road against the Earthquakes again, this time beating San Jose 3–0.  On July 3, 1977, the largest home crowd of the season, 32,165, attended the game against the Cosmos, for Brazilian superstar Pelé's last competitive appearance in Los Angeles. The Aztec won the game 4–1.  The Aztecs finished the season in second place of the Pacific Conference Southern Division with a record of fifteen wins and eleven losses.  The Aztecs were defeated by the Seattle Sounders in the Conference Championships after having beaten the Earthquakes in the first round, and Dallas Tornado over two-legs in the Division Championships.

After the season, the team was purchased by a group headed by Alan Rothenberg with former Los Angeles Lakers player Rudy LaRusso named general manager.  The Aztecs also signed a lease to play its homes matches at the Rose Bowl for the 1978 North American Soccer League season. In the first game of the season, the Aztecs lost to the Houston Hurricane in a shoot-out after playing to a 2–2 draw. Rumor's of Best's extravagant lifestyle and various personal problems, including alcoholism, began to spread during the previous season.  After missing two training sessions and meeting with the team owners to address his concerns with the direction of the club, Best skipped the team's final practice before their May 10, 1978, match against the Oakland Stompers, and the team announced his indefinite suspension. The following month, the team traded Best to the Fort Lauderdale Strikers, with the Aztecs receiving players George Dewsnip, Andy Rowland and the Strikers first 1980 draft choice. On June 6, 1978, and with a record of five wins in thirteen games, the Aztecs fired head coach Terry Fisher and replaced him with Tommie Smith. With only three wins during the next fourteen games, Smith was replaced by team Director of Personnel Peter Short for the final two games of the season. The Aztecs finished the season in last place of the National Conference Western Division, recording nine wins and twenty-one loses.  It was the team's worst outdoor season record and the only outdoor season the Aztecs did not qualify for the playoffs.  The Aztecs did not participate in the 1978 NASL Skelly Indoor Invitational, but did play a few indoor exhibition games in March 1978.

Michels & Cruyff Years

On November 14, 1978, team president Larry Friend announced former FC Barcelona, AFC Ajax, and Dutch national team manager Rinus Michels had been hired as head coach.  Michels revamped the team's roster with only four players from the Aztecs 1978 team remaining on the roster for the 1979 NASL season.  The Aztecs started the season with a record of five wins in seven games when on May 22, 1979, the team announced the signing of three-time Ballon d'Or winner Johan Cruyff on a $1.4 million contract over two years which also included a percentage of gate receipts, making Cruyff the highest paid athlete in Southern California.  The Aztecs finished the season in second place of the National Conference Western Division with a record of eighteen wins and twelve losses.  Prior to signing Cruyff, the Aztecs averaged 7,500 fans a game, but ended the season with an average attendance of 14,333. The Aztecs defeated the Washington Diplomats two games to none in the first round of the playoffs.  The Aztecs won the home leg of the Conference Semifinals agsinst the Vancouver Whitecaps in an overtime shootout, but lost the away leg and the 30 minute mini game.  Cruyff was awarded the league MVP and Larry Hulcer was named the Rookie of the Year for the 1979 season.

From September through October 1979, the team embarked on a three-country European tour beginning with a 2–1 victory over Paris Saint-Germain F.C.  The team then played six games in the Netherlands winning three, losing two and earning one draw.  On the team's final leg through England, the Aztec drew 1–1 against Birmingham City F.C. and lost 2–0 to Chelsea F.C.  Mexican media company Televisa purchased the team in early 1980 and sold the team's rights to Johan Cruyff to the Washington Diplomats for $1 million in order to save payroll money and foster a different image for the team.  The Aztecs participated in the 1979–80 NASL Indoor season earning only two wins in twelve matches. A few weeks prior to the beginning of the 1980 outdoor season, Michels resigned has head coach, but was able to reach an agreement with the new owners and confirmed he would be returning.  The Aztecs finished the 1980 season in second place of the National Conference Western Division with a record of twenty wins and twelve losses. Losing the first game of the Conference Quarterfinals at RFK Stadium the Aztecs defeated the Diplomats in the series by winning the home leg in a shootout, and the 30-minute minigame 2–0.  The Aztecs advanced to the Conference Championships  after defeating the Seattle Sounders in another shootout after each team won their home leg and playing to a 1–1 tie in the minigame.  The Aztecs were defeated by the New York Cosmos in both games of the Conference Championships.  Less than a month after the team was eliminated from the playoffs, Michels left the team for the position of technical director of FC Köln.

Final Season
The Aztecs achieved their best indoor season record with eleven wins and seven loses and earning first place of the Western Division in the 1980–81 NASL Indoor season but were eliminated in the first round of the playoffs by Edmonton Drillers.  On January 9, 1981, the Aztecs announced Cláudio Coutinho had signed a two year contract to coach the team.  The team also moved back to the Los Angeles Memorial Coliseum to play their home games for the 1981 outdoor season. The Aztecs finished the 1981 North American Soccer League season in second place of the Western Division with a record of nineteen wins and thirteen losses and an average attendance of 5,814.  The team was knocked out of the first round of the playoffs by the Montreal Manic two games to one, the last game decided on a controversial penalty call in overtime.  Following the season on December 9, 1981, Televisa released a statement stating the team would not be operating for the 1982 season and that any remaining player contracts would be sold.

Year-by-year

Notable players 

 Javier Aguirre
 Gary Allison
 Lee Atack
 Desmond Backos
 Phil Beal
 George Best
 Željko Bilecki
 Bob Bolitho
 Colin Boulton
 Colin Clarke
 Martin Cohen
 Charlie Cooke
 Julio César Cortés
 Renato Costa
 Peter Coyne
 Johan Cruyff
 Chris Dangerfield
 Steve David
 Ron Davies
 Antonio de la Torre Villalpando
 Roberto de Oliveira
 George Dewsnip
 Angelo DiBernardo
 Vito Dimitrijević
 Tony Douglas
 Gary Etherington
 Bernie Fagan
 Mike Ferguson
 Santiago Formoso
 Randy Garber
 Poli Garcia
 Steve Gay
 Uruguay Graffigna
 Austin Hayes
 Graham Horn
 Larry Hulcer
 Alan Jones
 Garry Jones
 Jerry Kazarian
 Alan Kelley
 Jimmy Kelly
 Mihalj Keri
 György Kottán
 Bob Lenarduzzi
 Dave Lennard
 Malcolm Linton
 Sammy Llewellyn
 Miguel Lopez
 Luís Fernando Gaúcho
 Terry Mancini
 Jackie Marsh
 John Mason
 Bobby McAlinden
 John McGrane
 Mike McLenaghen
 Doug McMillan
 Alan Merrick
 Ramón Mifflin
 Ane Mihailovich
 Jim Millinder
 Bill Mishalow
 Ramon Moraldo
 Dave Morrison
 Buzz Parsons
 Hugo Pérez
 Héctor Pulido
 Brian Quinn
 Luiz Rangel
 Tom Reynolds
 Bob Rigby
 Andy Rolland
 Rubén Omar Romano
 Thomas Rongen
 Alex Russell
 Miro Rys
 Todd Saldana
 Bill Sautter
 Dave Shelton
 Bobby Sibbald
 Dave Smith
 Tommy Smith
 Franciszek Smuda
 Frantz St. Lot
 Wim Suurbier
 Chris Turner
 Juli Veee
 Leo van Veen
 Sergio Velazquez
 Scott Vorst
 Walter Wagner
 Rudy Ybarra

Ownership
 Dr. Jack Gregory – Founder / co-owner
 Elton John – co-owner
 Alan Rothenberg – owner (1977–80)
 Televisa – owners (1980–1981)

Honors

NASL championships
 1974

NASL Regular Season Premierships
 1974

Division Champions
 1974 Western Division
 1980–81 Western Division (indoor)

League MVP
 1979 Johan Cruyff

Rookie of the Year
 1974 Doug McMillan
 1979 Larry Hulcer

League scoring champion
 1977 Steve David (26 goals, 6 assists, 58 points)

League goal scoring champion
 1977 Steve David (26 goals)

League Assists Leader
 1974 Doug McMillan (10 assists)
 1977 George Best (18 assists)

Indoor All-Stars
 1980–81 Mihalj Keri, Chris Dangerfield

All-Star first team selections
 1976 George Best
 1977 Steve David, George Best
 1979 Johan Cruyff

All-Star second team selections
 1974 Luis Marotte, Doug McMillan
 1977 Charlie Cooke
 1979 Mihalj Keri
 1980 Luis Fernando, Mihalj Keri
 1981 Mihalj Keri

All-Star honorable mentions
 1976 Charlie Cooke
 1979 Wim Suurbier

U.S. Soccer Hall of Fame
 2003 Bob Lenarduzzi
 2006 Hugo Pérez

Canadian Soccer Hall of Fame
 2001 Bob Lenarduzzi
 2003 Buzz Parsons
 2004 Bob Bolitho
 2008 John McGrane

Indoor Soccer Hall of Fame
 2012 Juli Veee
 2013 Brian Quinn

Notes

References

 
Association football clubs established in 1974
Association football clubs disestablished in 1981
North American Soccer League (1968–1984) teams
Defunct soccer clubs in California
Soccer clubs in California
Defunct indoor soccer clubs in the United States
1973 establishments in California
1981 disestablishments in California
Elton John